The Cornell–Princeton lacrosse rivalry is a college lacrosse rivalry between Princeton University and Cornell University and their respective men's lacrosse teams, Princeton Tigers and Cornell Big Red.  The rivalry stems from the dominance of the two programs in the Ivy League where in the first 65 seasons (1956 through 2022 seasons, excluding pandemic canceled years of 2020 and 2021) Cornell has won 30 Ivy League Championships (18 outright, 12 shared) and Princeton has won 27 league titles (18 outright, 9 shared).  The next nearest team is Brown with 11 titles (five outright, six shared) The Ivy League awards the league championship to the team with the best record at the conclusion of the regular season. In the event two or more teams are tied with identical records the title is shared with no tie breaking mechanism. The teams shared the title in 2002, 2004, 2006, 2009, 2010 (also with Brown and Yale) and 2015 (also with Brown).

CornellBigRed.com describes the rivalry as "The marquee matchup in Ivy League lacrosse". Cornell claims three NCAA Division I Men's Lacrosse Championships (1971, 1976, 1977) and four pre-NCAA era national championships (1903, 1907, 1914, 1916). Princeton claims six NCAA championships (1992, 1994, 1996, 1997, 1998, 2001) and six pre-NCAA era national championships (1884, 1885, 1937, 1942, 1951, 1953). The most recent Ivy League title for Cornell was 2022 when they shared the title with Yale and Brown, tied with identical 4-2 records. Princeton's most recent title was 2015 which they shared with Cornell and Brown, again with identical 4-2 records.

Although the two schools have a long rivalry, they did not oppose each other in postseason play until the quarterfinals of the 2009 NCAA Division I Men's Lacrosse Championship at Hofstra University's Shuart Stadium. Cornell won 6–4. In 2010, Princeton defeated Cornell 10–9 in the inaugural Ivy League lacrosse championship tournament and received the league's automatic berth to the 2010 NCAA Division I Men's Lacrosse Championship.  Cornell would win the 2011 Ivy League tournament, defeating Harvard 15-6 in the final. Princeton would defeat Cornell in the semifinals of both the 2013 and 2015 tournaments but would fall to Yale in the championship game both times. Cornell would win the Ivy League tournament again in 2018 and therefore has two titles to Princeton's one although both trail Yale's five tournament championships.

The teams first met in 1922, with Princeton winning 11–1. With a record of 42–40–2 over 84 games, Princeton remains the only conference team with an all-time winning record against Cornell.

Rival Accomplishments 
The following summarizes the accomplishments of the two programs.

Game Results

References

College lacrosse rivalries in the United States
Princeton
Princeton Tigers men's lacrosse
1922 establishments in the United States